The Athens-Belpre Rail-Trail is a new trailway now being developed in southeast Ohio. It will link Athens, Ohio, in Athens County, with Belpre, Ohio, in Washington County. It will link on the west with the Hockhocking Adena Bikeway. There are hopes of eventually connecting with the North Bend Rail Trail in West Virginia. It will largely use the former B&O Railroad line from Belpre to Athens, which began as the B&O Short Line, and which became part of the B&O main line to St. Louis, Missouri.

The eastern spadefoot toad, Scaphiopus holbrookii, is known to inhabit one section of the right-of-way.

See also

List of rail trails
Dawkins Line Rail Trail
Pine Mountain State Scenic Trail
Little Miami Scenic Trail

External links
Athens-Belpre Rail Trail
Athens Conservancy: Athens-Belpre Rail Trail

Bike paths in Ohio
Rail trails in Ohio
Hiking trails in Ohio
Protected areas of Athens County, Ohio
Transportation in Athens County, Ohio
Protected areas of Washington County, Ohio
Transportation in Washington County, Ohio